For information on all New Jersey Institute of Technology sports, see NJIT Highlanders

The NJIT Highlanders baseball team represents the New Jersey Institute of Technology in Newark, New Jersey in NCAA Division I baseball. They are members of the America East Conference. The team competes in the America East Conference within the National Collegiate Athletic Association's Division I. The Highlanders are coached by Robbie McClellan.

Major League Baseball
NJIT has had 3 Major League Baseball Draft selections since the draft began in 1965.

See also
List of NCAA Division I baseball programs

References

External links